Scrappy is a cartoon character created by Dick Huemer for Charles Mintz's Screen Gems Studio (distributed by Columbia Pictures). A little round-headed boy, Scrappy often found himself involved in off-beat neighborhood adventures. Usually paired with his little brother Oopy (originally Vontzy), Scrappy also had an on-again, off-again girlfriend named Margy and a Scotty dog named Yippy. In later shorts the annoying little girl Brat and pesky pet Petey Parrot also appeared.

Huemer created the character in 1931, and he remained aboard Mintz's studio until 1933.  With Huemer's departure, his colleagues Sid Marcus and Art Davis assumed control of the series. The final regular entry in the series, Scrappy's Rodeo was released in 1939. Scrappy would continue to appear in the Phantasies and Fables series. The final cartoon featuring Scrappy, The Little Theatre, was released on February 7, 1941.

Shorts

Note: "Holiday Land", "Doctor Bluebird", "In My Gondola", and "The Merry Mutineers" are all a part of the Color Rhapsody series, and all shorts starting with "The Charm Bracelet" are either a part of the Phantasies or Fables series.

References

External links
 Harry McCracken's Scrappyland
 The Columbia Crow's Nest via The Wayback Machine

Film characters introduced in 1931
Film series introduced in 1931
Animated human characters
Child characters in animated films
Male characters in animation
Fictional infants
Columbia cartoons series and characters
Screen Gems film series